This Summer may refer to:
 "This Summer" (Squeeze song), 1995
 This Summer (EP), by Alessia Cara, 2019

See also
 "This Summer's Gonna Hurt like a MotherFucker", a song by Maroon 5, 2015
 "This Summer I", a song by Vitamin C from More, 2001